John Henry Feebery (10 May 1888 – 1960) was an English professional footballer who played as a full back or half back. He made nearly 300 appearances in the Football League for Bolton Wanderers, Exeter City and Brighton & Hove Albion.

Life and career
Feebery was born in Hucknall, Nottinghamshire, in 1888. He came from a footballing family: two brothers, Albert and Alf, also played in the Football League, and three others played at lesser levels. Feebery began his career with local clubs Hucknall and Bulwell White Star before signing for First Division club Bolton Wanderers in 1908, initially on amateur forms. He turned professional ahead of the 1909–10 season, and made his senior debut in September against Woolwich Arsenal in a 3–0 win; the Nottingham Evening Post wrote that they played so well that the same team was picked for the next match, "including Feebery, the Bulwell White Star half-back." He remained a regular in the side, playing his final match for the club in a 2–1 defeat at home to Chelsea on 7 February 1920. He made 160 league appearances for Wanderersall but the 1910–11 season were in the top flightand scored 16 goals; he had a powerful shot, and was the team's regular free-kick and penalty-taker.

He moved on to Exeter City, about to embark on their maiden season in the newly formed Third Division South. He was ever-present through the campaign, but left the club at the end of it in unusual circumstances. His name was inadvertently left off the retained list, Brighton & Hove Albion's manager Charlie Webb spotted the omission, and promptly signed him before Exeter's officials could fix their mistake. Webb appointed Feebery captain, and he was again ever-present through his first season with his new club. He stayed with Brighton for two more years, taking his appearance count to 67 in all competitions, before leaving on a free transfer to Mid Rhondda United of the Southern League.

Feebery died in Nottingham in early 1960 at the age of 71.

References

1888 births
1960 deaths
People from Hucknall
Footballers from Nottinghamshire
English footballers
Association football fullbacks
Bolton Wanderers F.C. players
Exeter City F.C. players
Brighton & Hove Albion F.C. players
Mid Rhondda F.C. players
English Football League players
Southern Football League players